Events from the year 2017 in Northern Cyprus

Incumbents
 President: Mustafa Akıncı
 Prime Minister: Hüseyin Özgürgün
 Speaker of Parliament: Sibel Siber

Events

Deaths

7 March – Kamran Aziz, musician and pharmacist (b. 1922).

References

 
Years of the 21st century in Northern Cyprus
Northern Cyprus
Northern Cyprus
2017